Alexandre de Dardel (8 November 1885 – 30 July 1935) was a Swiss fencer. He competed in the team foil event at the 1928 and 1936 Summer Olympics.

References

External links

1885 births
1935 deaths
Swiss male fencers
Olympic fencers of Switzerland
Fencers at the 1928 Summer Olympics